Holy Family School may refer to:

Holy Family School (Seattle, Washington) in Seattle, Washington
Holy Family School (Port Allen) in Port Allen, Louisiana
Holy Family Catholic School,West Yorkshire(England)

See also 
Holy Family High School (disambiguation)
Holy Family Catholic High School (disambiguation)
Holy Family (disambiguation)